Étienne Grandmont is a Canadian politician, who was elected to the National Assembly of Quebec in the 2022 Quebec general election. He represents the riding of Taschereau as a member of Québec solidaire.

Electoral record

References

21st-century Canadian politicians
Québec solidaire MNAs
Living people
Year of birth missing (living people)
Politicians from Quebec City
French Quebecers